Herbert Frederick Wade (14 September 1905 – 23 November 1980) was a South African cricketer who played in 10 Test matches in 1935 and 1935–36.

A middle-order batsman, Wade captained South Africa in every Test that he played in, including the series in England in 1935 that South Africa won 1–0 with four Tests drawn.

After leaving Hilton College, where he was a contemporary of his predecessor as South Africa's captain, Jock Cameron, Wade played for Natal from 1924–25 to 1936–37, with a top score of 190 against Eastern Province in his second-last game. He captained the side from 1930–31 until his retirement, and in his career he was captain in 61 of his 74 first-class matches.

His younger brother Billy also played Test cricket for South Africa after Herby retired.

References

External links

1905 births
1980 deaths
Colony of Natal people
Cricketers from Durban
KwaZulu-Natal cricketers
South Africa Test cricket captains
South African people of British descent
White South African people
Alumni of Hilton College (South Africa)